To Deng railway station is a railway station located in To Deng Subdistrict, Su-ngai Padi District, Narathiwat.

South Thailand insurgency events 
On 3 November 2013, a separatist bomb exploded at To Deng railway station, killing one military volunteer. The 5 kg bomb was planted at the southern railway track gate in a metal box, about 200 metres from To Deng station building. A group of nine military volunteers went to open the railway track gate for the Local No. 448 Sungai Kolok-Surat Thani to enter the station. However, as they were opening the gates, separatists ignited the bomb, and a military volunteer (who died afterwards) took the full impact of the bomb. The other eight volunteers were therefore safe. As a result of the bombings, Local No. 448 was delayed for 2 hours.

Services 
 Local No. 447/448 Surat Thani-Sungai Kolok-Surat Thani
 Local No. 451/452 Nakhon Si Thammarat-Sungai Kolok-Nakhon Si Thammarat
 Local No. 453/454 Yala-Sungai Kolok-Yala
 Local No. 463/464 Phatthalung-Sungai Kolok-Phatthalung

References 

 
 

Railway stations in Thailand